Vicki Lynch, known professionally as Hyapatia Lee, is an American former adult film actress. As part Cherokee, she was the only Native American in the adult business during her tenure; this contributed to her becoming one of the best-known actresses of the Golden Age of Porn. Lee is an AVN and XRCO Hall of Fame inductee.

Early life and education
Lee was born in Haughville, Indianapolis, to teenage parents and is of Cherokee and Irish descent. She attended the local high school, where she performed in several musicals.

Career
In 1984, Lee appeared in Sweet Young Foxes and Penthouse magazine.

Over time, her husband Bud Lee joined the cast and crew of her films. Together they created the second-most-expensive pornographic film (at the time), The Ribald Tales of Canterbury (1985), a version of Geoffrey Chaucer's The Canterbury Tales.

In 1993, she was inducted into the AVN Hall of Fame, and the XRCO Hall of Fame in 1994. She was also given the Lifetime Achievement Award from the Free Speech Coalition in 1995.

In 1998, members of her fan club received a report that she had died due to diabetes. The report was inaccurate.

Like many adult performers of the era, she retained no rights to her films.

Music
For SRO Records, Lee recorded the 7-inch single "Telephone Man", released in 1988; and the album Two Sides Of Hyapatia Lee in 1989. "Rub-a-Dub-Dub" from the album featured on Dr. Demento's 'Funny Five' playlist, airing April 30, 1989.

In 1994, Lee recorded the album Double Euphoric with her band W4IK. She toured with the same band, which was based in Los Angeles, and also with another band, based in Indiana, called Vision Quest.

In 1999, one of Lee's tracks from her 1994 release appeared on the music CD Porn to Rock.

Double Euphoric was re-released in September 2010, both in physical and digital versions, via outlets such as CD Baby, Amazon and Apple iTunes.

Writing
Lee is an online columnist for High Times.
In 1993, Lee co-wrote an autobiography comic book with Jay Allen Sanford, Carnal Comics: Hyapatia Lee, featuring her true life story illustrated by the Vampirella artist Louis Small Jr.. She also took part in and appeared within the Carnal Comics title Triple-X Cinema: A Cartoon History, as well as co-starring with her friend Porsche Lynn in another issue of the adult comic book line. In 2000, Lee self-published an autobiography, The Secret Life of Hyapatia Lee. In 2016, she authored a self-help book, Native Strength – The First Step on the Path to an Indomitable Life, the first in a series.

Personal life
Lee views Hyapatia as a particular personality that allowed her to perform. She met and married Bud Lee, with whom she bought land in rural southern Indiana, where she has lived since. The couple had two children, whom she homeschooled at their Indiana home. In 1993 she retired from the industry and separated from Bud the same year. She has since remarried and had another child.

Publications

Awards
 1991 AVN Best Actress – Film for The Masseuse
 1993 F.O.X.E Female Fan Favorite
 1993 AVN Hall of Fame Inductee
 1994 XRCO Hall of Fame Inductee
 1995 Free Speech Coalition – Lifetime Achievement Award

References

Further reading

External links
  – 
 
 
 

Year of birth missing (living people)
Living people
21st-century American women writers
American pornographic film actresses
American pornographic film directors
American women pop singers
American people of Irish descent
American people of Cherokee descent
American stage actresses
Women pornographic film directors
Actresses from Indianapolis
Pornographic film actors from Indiana
Native American pornographic film actors